Sarah Gillespie is a British American singer songwriter and writer based in London. She has four albums, known for combining poetic lyrics with folk, blues and elements of jazz. Her debut collection of poetry, Queen Ithaca Blues, was published by Albion Beatnik Press. Gillespie's fourth album, Wishbones, was arranged and co-produced by Mercury nominated pianist and composer Kit Downes. Her band features Kit Downes - organ and piano, James Maddren - drums, Ruth Goller - bass, Chris Montague - guitar and special guest Laura Jurd - trumpet. Wishbones was launched at the Southbank Centre's Purcell Room on October 29, 2018. During the lockdown of 2020, Gillespie launched her Create Now Academy delivering mentoring programs and workshops for women songwriters.

Biography 
Sarah Gillespie was born in London to an American mother and British father. On her mother's side Gillespie is related to CIA London Station chief Cleveland Cram and Irish politician Richard Mulcahy. She grew up in Norfolk, interspersed with numerous trips to Minnesota where she listened to Bessie Smith, Bob Dylan, Cole Porter and early blues and jazz. From the age of four, Gillespie composed songs on piano, and then at 13 began playing guitar. At 18, she moved to the US, busking in the streets and playing gigs.

On returning to London, she gained a first class degree in Film and Literature and an MA in Politics and Philosophy from Goldsmiths, University of London. Gillespie's albums Stalking Juliet (2009), In the Current Climate (2011) Glory Days (2013) Wishbones (2018) and her anti war narrative suite The War on Trevor (2012) have all been praised by critics.

Gillespie plays festivals, clubs, arts centres and theatres in the UK and Europe. She has performed live on BBC Radio 4's Woman's Hour, Loose Ends, BBC London and Jazz FM, and received airplay on BBC Radio 2,  BBC Radio 3 and local stations in Europe and America. On 21 November 2011 Gillespie was interviewed by Andrew Marr on BBC Radio 4's Start the Week on the emerging role of politics in the arts. She was awarded by the British PRS for Music 'Women Make Music Scheme' in 2012 for her narrative music project The War on Trevor which she launched with two headline shows at Ronnie Scott's.

Musical style 
Gillespie composes her material on the guitar. She cites her main influences as Tom Waits, Cole Porter, Bob Dylan early blues and jazz, poets T. S. Eliot and James Tate and the 1950s Beat Poetry movement.  Her style has been described as 'mixing folk, jazz and blues' with an emphasis on the lyrical content and delivery. The Guardian's jazz critic John Fordham writes "Gillespie, who joins Bob Dylan's lyrical bite and languid delivery to the forthrightness of Joni Mitchell, with a little rap-like percussiveness thrown in, is an original." Robert Shore of London's Metro points to "her Beat-like verbal collages ('Cinnamon ginseng bootleg bourbon Calvados Berlin') and beautifully controlled associative word strings, all delivered with her distinctive vocal mixture of dark romanticism and punkish attitude".

Gillespie's compositions, Houdini of the Heart and Cinematic Nectar have been described as "blistering and beautiful" and "original, hard-edged".

Discography 
Stalking Juliet – 2009 (Egea)
"How The Mighty Fall" – single, 2009 (Egea)
In The Current Climate – 2011 (Pastiche Records)
The War on Trevor – 2012 (Pastiche Records)
Glory Days – 2013 (Pastiche Records)
Roundhouse Bounty – 2016 (Audio Network)
Wishbones – 2018 (Pastiche Records)

Reviews 
Gillespie has received four and five star reviews from The Arts Desk, The Guardian, Mojo, The Independent, The Financial Times, Metro, Rock n' Reel and the UK local press. English musician Robert Wyatt described In The Current Climate as "an utterly wonderful new record. Expected and got in spades Sarah's unique way with words plus terrific guitar playing, inspiring production and not just great songs, but totally original music. Brilliant, the bee's knees."

Her live performances have been described as 'outstanding, vivacious and forceful'. The Nottingham Evening Post noted 'her verbal exchanges with her band were at times hilarious and on other occasions explosive'.

Gillespie's most recent album, Wishbones (2018), received five stars from The Arts Desk and four stars from The Financial Times. Glory Days (2013) received five stars in Rock n' Real Magazine, five stars in Buzz Magazine, four stars in The Independent and the Financial Times. London's Metro commented ‘Sarah Gillespie regularly has critics reaching for big-name comparisons. Is she the new Joni Mitchell? PJ Harvey? Bob Dylan even? Mixing jazz-folk artistry and punk attitude, third album Glory Days (Pastiche) recalls all three in places but Gillespie’s spiky lyrical gift is utterly distinctive'.
In 2014 the album was released on vinyl by UK record label Those Old Records.

 Writings and politics 
Gillespie has written articles for Al Jazeera, CounterPunch, Middle East Online and The Palestine Chronicle, writing about issues surrounding liberalism, Islam and the west, critiquing liberals "who imagine that their belief in equality makes them superior". In the Arab News, Shabana Syed in 2010 described Gillespie as "an artist at the forefront of the demand for change". Gillespie critiques the misuse of feminism in the interventionalist agenda and what she refers to as "atheist fundamentalism", saying: "The mantra of the French Revolution was: 'Freedom, equality, fraternity or death!' Pragmatically this has now unfolded into its tragic meaning: 'Be free, equal and secular – or we'll kill you.'"

Gillespie is an outspoken critic of Zionism and has orchestrated several fundraising concerts for Palestinian organisations including Medical Aid for Palestinians. In October 2010, she performed alongside The Unthanks, Cleveland Watkiss, Seb Rochford, Palestinian hip hop artist Shadia Mansour and Atzmon's Orient House Ensemble at the JAZZA Festival for the Free Palestine Movement.
 
Reviewing In the Current Climate, The Jazz Breakfast wrote in 2010: "The personal life and the sociopolitical one are blended with references to everything from the Dow Jones and the Hang Index to John the Baptist and Zeus. For How The West Was Won, Gillespie sings an imaginary first person song of Shaker Aamer, the remaining British prisoner in Camp X-Ray".

In 2012 Gillespie released a 16-minute narrative music project, The War on Trevor.'' The piece charts the travails of a Londoner (Trevor) suspected of various crimes ranging from public indecency and infidelity to terrorism, with Gillespie drawing on high-profile cases, including those of Jean Charles de Menezes and Moazzam Begg. Reviewing the launch at Ronnie Scott's on 4 April 2012,  Jazzwise described the piece as a "partly comic, partly deadly serious take on The War on Terror.". The Times music critique David Sinclair dubbed it 'a prog-jazz epic."

References

External links
 Sarah Gillespie Music

Year of birth missing (living people)
Living people
British women singer-songwriters
American women singer-songwriters
Alumni of the University of Greenwich
Alumni of Goldsmiths, University of London
Singers from London
Women guitarists
American women guitarists
English women guitarists
English guitarists
People from Greenwich
American singer-songwriters
21st-century American women